Max Mitchell (born October 12, 1999) is an American football offensive tackle for the New York Jets of the National Football League (NFL). He played college football at Louisiana.

Early life and high school
Mitchell grew up in Monroe, Louisiana and attended Neville High School. Mitchell was rated a two-star recruit and committed to play college football at Louisiana over offers from lower-division schools Northwestern State, Arkansas-Monticello, Millsaps, and Ouachita Baptist.

College career
Mitchell played in all 14 of the Ragin' Cajuns' games as a freshman. He was named a starter going into his sophomore year and started every game for Louisiana. Mitchell started at both left and right tackle as a junior and was named second-team All-Sun Belt Conference. As a senior, he was named first-team All-Sun Belt and a third-team All-American by the Associated Press. After the season, Mitchell received invitations to play in the Senior Bowl and participate in the NFL Combine.

Professional career

Mitchell was selected in the fourth round, pick 111, of the 2022 NFL Draft by the New York Jets. He was named the Jets starting right tackle to begin the season. He started the first four games before suffering a knee injury in Week 4. He was placed on injured reserve on October 8, 2022. He was activated on November 26. He was placed on the non-football injury list on December 7.

References

External links
 New York Jets bio
Louisiana Ragin' Cajuns bio

Living people
American football offensive tackles
Players of American football from Louisiana
Louisiana Ragin' Cajuns football players
1999 births
Sportspeople from Monroe, Louisiana
New York Jets players